Revenge! is a 1971 British thriller film directed by Sidney Hayers and starring Joan Collins, James Booth and Sinéad Cusack. The screenplay concerns a family who seek brutal revenge on the man who they suspect attacked their daughter. The film is based on the novel There Was an Old Woman by Lou Ellen Davis.

In May 1976 this was released in the United States under the title Inn of the Frightened People.

Plot
Pub landlords Jim and Carol Radford (James Booth and Joan Collins) are grieving for the death of their young daughter Jenny, who was raped and murdered by Seely (Kenneth Griffith); Jim has two other children by his first marriage, Lee (Tom Marshall) and Jill (Zuleika Robson). Seely is arrested for the crime by the Inspector (Donald Morley), but ultimately released due to a lack of evidence. As well as Jenny, Seely is suspected of also killing the daughter of Jim's friend Harry (Ray Barrett). Seely himself lives a quiet, hermit-like existence, but he is observed stopping at a primary school near his house to watch the children.

Seeking revenge, Harry and Lee urge Jim to kidnap Seely and keep him in the cellar of his pub. After some persuasion, Jim agrees to the plan; they capture Seely, beat him beyond recognition and keep him locked beneath the pub. This puts pressure on the Radford family, who don't dare release him but are too afraid to kill him. Having Seely in the cellar puts a strain on the relationships within the family, especially between Carol and Lee, and also on the business, when Carol tries to prevent brewery deliveryman Fred (Geoffrey Hughes) from delivering the stock. Things reach a head when it seems that Seely may be innocent after all, and the relationships between Jim, Harry and Lee become more fractured.

Cast
 James Booth as Jim Radford 
 Joan Collins as Carol Radford 
 Tom Marshall as Lee Radford 
 Zuleika Robson as Jill Radford 
 Ray Barrett as Harry 
 Sinéad Cusack as Rose 
 Kenneth Griffith as Seely 
 Donald Morley as Inspector 
 Barry Andrews as Sergeant
 Artro Morris as Jacko 
 Patrick McAlinney as George 
 Angus MacKay as Priest 
 Geoffrey Hughes as Fred, the brewery driver 
 Nicola Critcher as Lucy

Tom Marshall, Zuleika Robson and Donald Morley all had their voices dubbed, by Nicky Henson, Michele Dotrice and Garfield Morgan respectively.

Release

Home media
When it was released in the United States on video, it was retitled Terror from Under the House. That version is available as a region-free DVD. The region 1 DVD is titled Revenge!

Critical reception
David McGillivray wrote in the Radio Times, "what begins as a serious examination of a growing social problem becomes increasingly melodramatic, ending in a blaze of hysterical shrieking and stabbing. Quite unconvincing, enjoyable for all the wrong reasons" ; while the Joan Collins Archive described it as "an entertaining slice of 70s sensationalism."

References

External links
 

1971 films
Films directed by Sidney Hayers
1970s thriller films
British thriller films
Films shot at Pinewood Studios
1970s English-language films
1970s British films